Dudley George Helfrich (17 May 1912 – 13 June 1980) was a South African cricketer who played first-class cricket for Griqualand West, Transvaal and North-Eastern Transvaal between 1929 and 1940. He was the eldest of four brothers who played first-class cricket in South Africa.

He opened the batting in North-Eastern Transvaal's first first-class match in 1937–38. In their second match he hit his highest score, 92, against his former team Transvaal, in North-Eastern Transvaal's first first-class victory.

References

External links

1912 births
1980 deaths
South African cricketers
Griqualand West cricketers
Gauteng cricketers
Northerns cricketers
Cricketers from Kimberley, Northern Cape